Moment of Truth is the second and final album by ELO Part II, released on October 1, 1994. The cover illustration by Graham Reynolds depicts an incandescent light bulb shattering. The light bulb image continues a visual theme that began with the light bulb depicted on the cover of Electric Light Orchestra's debut album. Moment of Truth and the single "One More Tomorrow" would determine if ELO Part II would continue re-establishing themselves in America. "The Fox" was originally from the 1985 Kelly Groucutt EP, We Love Animals.

The album was reissued in 2021 by Renaissance Records on CD and 2xLP, marking the first time Moment of Truth was available on LP. Both the CD and LP releases included bonus tracks.

Reception
In 1994, Music & Media called Moment of Truth "thin" in comparison to ELO Part II's predecessor Electric Light Orchestra (ELO). They also noted the way ELO Part II handled symphonic rock was similar to the way Alan Parsons handled it. In an earlier issue that year, Music & Media noted the single "Power of a Million Lights" as having a consistent sound compared to ELO with Jeff Lynne, the only difference being the change from strings to synthesizers.

Track listing
Original CD

Tracks included on 2021 reissue:

Personnel
Bev Bevan – drums
Eric Troyer – keyboards, vocals, lead vocals (tracks 3, 6, 11, 16)
Phil Bates – guitar, vocals, lead vocals (tracks 2, 5, 7, 13)
Kelly Groucutt – bass guitar, vocals, lead vocals (tracks 10, 12, 15)
Mik Kaminski – violin
Louis Clark – orchestral keyboards and arrangements

Additional musicians
Percussion: Hossam Ramzy
Strings: The London Session Orchestra; leader: Gavyn Wright

References

1994 albums
ELO Part II albums